Philogonius (or Filogonius, Philogonus, Philogonios, ; died 322) was a lawyer and an early Bishop of Antioch who came to be considered a saint. He opposed Arianism when that heresy emerged in Alexandria, Egypt.
His feast day is 20 December.

Outline

Philogonius was a successful advocate at the bar of Antioch.
He was known for his eloquence, moral integrity and Christian faith.
He married and had a daughter, but became a monk and ascetic after his wife died.
In 318 when Vitalis died Philogonius was made Bishop of Antioch without first becoming a priest.
When Arius (256–336) began to preach his heresy at Alexandria in 318, Saint Alexander sent a synodal letter condemning him to Philogonius, who defended the orthodox faith against the heresy.
Philogonius lived through the attacks on the church by Maximin II (r. 310–313) and Licinius (r. 308 to 324).
He died in 322.

Monks of Ramsgate account

The monks of St Augustine's Abbey, Ramsgate, wrote in their Book of Saints (1921),

Butler's account

The hagiographer Alban Butler (1710–1773) wrote in his Lives of the fathers, martyrs, and other principal saints,

Weninger's account

Francis Xavier Weninger (1805–1888) wrote in his Lives of the Saints (1876),

Notes

Citations

Sources

 

 

 

Saints from Roman Greece
322 deaths